Kohl Jik (also Romanized as Kohl Jīk) is a village in Garamduz Rural District, Garamduz District, Khoda Afarin County, East Azerbaijan Province, Iran. At the 2006 census, its population was 67, in 10 families.

References 

Populated places in Khoda Afarin County